Orcival (Auvergnat: Orsivau) is a commune in the Puy-de-Dôme department in Auvergne in central France. The 12th-13th century basilica of Notre Dame is a listed monument. It contains many ancient religious objects, including a 12th century procession statue of the Virgin and Child.

See also
Communes of the Puy-de-Dôme department

References

External links
 “Notre Dame d'Orcival.” All About Mary. International Marian Research Institute
 The International Marian Research Institute at the University of Dayton
 The Marian Library at the University of Dayton, repository of books, periodicals, artwork, and artifacts on Mary, the mother of Jesus Christ

Communes of Puy-de-Dôme